What Investment was a British magazine last published monthly by Bonhill Group plc. The magazine was established in 1982. The publication is distributed through branches of W H Smith as well as directly to subscribers. The magazine also has an online presence in the form of a website which provides news for retail investors on funds, stocks, shares, and markets.

The online magazine has two weekly newsletters: What Investment Trader - which is sent to digital readers on a Monday focussing on direct equity investment, large cap stocks, and day trading (shares, spread betting, CFDs, Forex margin trading, and covered warrants). The traditional What Investment Newsletter concentrates on unit trusts, investment trusts, and exchange traded products. What investment was created by Gregory Thain, who was also the original publisher. It was an essential source of investment news to the small/medium size investor prior to internet. The magazine launched the extremely successful "job blogs" column that was often the top performing share tipster in the'80.

Previous editors 
The following persons have been editor of What Investment:
 2021-2022 Rory Palmer
 2018-2022 Lawrence Gosling
2017-2018 Ingrid Smith
 2017 (acting) Ben Rossi
 2015-2017 David Thorpe
 2011-2015 Nicholas Britton
 2009-2011 Joe McGrath
 2009 (acting) Jennifer Lowe
 1990-2009 Keiron Root
 1982-1989 Christopher Gilchrist

References

External links
 

1982 establishments in the United Kingdom
Business magazines published in the United Kingdom
Magazines established in 1982
Magazines published in London
Monthly magazines published in the United Kingdom
Online magazines published in the United Kingdom